Olga Rodriguez may refer to:
 Olga Rodriguez (activist), Chicano activist and member of the Socialist Workers Party of the United States
 Olga Rodríguez (journalist), Spanish journalist and author